Fāṭimah bint ʿAmr (576) was the grandmother of the Muhammad and Ali ibn Abi Talib and one of the wives of Abd al-Muttalib ibn Hashim. She was from the Banu Makhzum clan of the Quraysh tribe, unlike her co-wives, who were all from outlying tribes and had relatively little influence in Mecca.

Her full name was Fatimah bint `Amr ibn `A'idh ibn `Imran ibn Makhzum ibn Yaqaza. Her mother was Sakhrah bint Abd ibn `Imran, also from Banu Makhzum; Sakhrah's mother was Takhmur bint `Abd ibn Qusai ibn Kilab.

Children of Fatima bint Amr
With Abd al-Muttalib, Fatima was the mother of three sons and five daughters:

Az-Zubayr - Married to Atika bint Abi Wahb and father of Duba'a, Abd-Allah, Atiqa, Majl, Umm al-Hakam, Safiya and Umm az-Zubayr.
‘Abd Manāf (Abu Talib) - Married to Fatima bint Asad ibn Hashim and father of Ṭālib, Fakhitah, Jumanah, Aqil, Rayta, Ja’far and Ali. His second wife was Illa, and their son was Tulayq.
Barrah bint Abd al-Muttalib - Married to Abu al-Asad ibn Hilāl of Banu Makhzūm and mother of Abdullah, Sufyān and  Aswad. Her second husband was Abu Ruhm ibn ‘Abd al- ‘Uzzā from the ‘Āmir ibn Luayy clan of the Quraysh. Their son was Abu Sabra. After Barrah's death, he married Maymuna bint Harith, and had a son, Atiqah. After Abu Ruhm's death, Maymuna married Muhammad.
Abdullah ibn Abd al-Muttalib - Married to Āminah bint Wahab and father of the Islamic prophet Muḥammad.
Umm Ḥakīm (al-Baiḍā) - Married to Kurayz ibn Rabī‘ah of Banu ‘Abdu Shams  and mother of ‘Āmir, Arwa (the mother of the future Caliph ‘Uthmān) Sa'diyya/ Sa'di, Ṭalḥah, Hakim and Barrah (Um Talha)
Arwā - Married at first to ‘Umayr ibn Wahb ibn Kathir, by whom she had a son, Tulayb. Her second husband was Arta ibn Sharahbil ibn Hāshim, by whom she had a daughter, Fāṭima.
‘Ātikah - Married first to Umar ibn Abdul Uzza ibn Qusayy, by whom she had a son, Zuhayr. Her second husband was Abu Umaiyah ibn al-Mughīrah ibn ‘Abdullah ibn ‘Umar ibn Makhzum ibn Yaqaẓah, by whom she was the mother of 'Abdullah, Zubayr and Qariba. After Atika's death, Abu Umayya married Atika bint Amir ibn Rabia and Atika bint Utba, the mothers of Hind, Qurayba, Hisham, Mas'ud, Rayta, Umayya and Muhajir.
Umaimah or Umamah - Married to Jahsh ibn Riyab of Banu Asad and mother of Abd-Allah, Ubayd-Allah, Abd (Abu Ahmad), Hamna or Hammanah, Zaynab, Habiba (Umm Habib).

Family tree

 * indicates that the marriage order is disputed
 Note that direct lineage is marked in bold.

See also
Amr (name)
Fatima (given name)
Family tree of Muhammad
Companions of the Prophet

References

External links
al-Islam.org

6th-century women
Family of Muhammad
6th-century Arabs
576 deaths
Year of birth unknown
Banu Makhzum